is a Japanese actor.

Filmography

Television
Shiroi Kyotō (1978) – Taniyama
Tokugawa Ieyasu (1983) – Kobayakawa Hideaki
Byakkotai (1986) – Sanjō Sanetomi
Kamen Rider Drive (2014) – Freeze/Soichi Makage
Gunshi Kanbei (2014) – Yoshida Kanemi
Segodon (2018) – Itakura Katsukiyo
Nemuri Kyōshirō The Final (2018,CX) - Mizuno Echizennokami
Reach Beyond the Blue Sky (2021) – Nakayama Tadayasu

Film
The Summer of the Ubume (2005) – Hiroyuki Sugano
Ajin: Demi-Human (2017)
Last Winter, We Parted (2018)
True Mothers (2020)
Bolt (2020)
The Voice of Sin (2020)
Nobutora (2021)
Ware Yowakereba: Yajima Kajiko-den (2022)
 School Lunch of Ashiya City (2022) – Tadao Murakami

References

External links
 – official site

JMDb profile (in Japanese)

Japanese male actors
1950 births
Living people
People from Tokyo